Luis Ángel César Sampedro (born 3 May 1966), known as Luis César, is a  Spanish retired footballer who played as a goalkeeper, currently a manager.

Playing career
Born in Vilagarcía de Arousa, Province of Pontevedra, Luis César played for Racing de Ferrol for nearly a decade, never appearing in higher than Segunda División B.

In 2000, precisely after the Galician club returned to the Segunda División after a 21-year absence, he retired from the game at the age of 34.

Coaching career
Immediately after retiring, César began coaching his only club, being relegated from division two in his third season and promoting immediately. In 2004, he signed with another team in the second tier, Gimnàstic de Tarragona.

Luis César led Nàstic to La Liga in the 2005–06 campaign, with the Catalans returning to the tournament after 56 years. On 26 November 2006, however, after a 2–3 home loss against RCD Mallorca, with the side having only totalled five points in 12 rounds, he was fired.

For 2007–08, César signed for Polideportivo Ejido in the second division, but did not finish the season once more, being sacked after the 21st matchday (out of 42), with Fernando Castro Santos taking his place as the Andalusians were relegated after a seven-year stay in the competition. On 6 March 2010, months after a move to UD Las Palmas was eventually aborted, he returned to Gimnàstic after the dismissal of César Ferrando, with the team eventually finishing in 18th position – the first place above the relegation zone – just one point ahead of Cádiz CF. 

On 6 December 2010, following a 1–2 home defeat to Villarreal CF B, Luis César was relieved of his duties at Gimnàstic, as the team ranked 22nd and last with just two wins in 15 games. In the 2011–12 campaign he was one of two managers in charge of CD Alcoyano, who were finally relegated from the second tier.

Luis César was appointed at Albacete Balompié on 20 March 2013, leading it to promotion at the end of his first full season. He was fired on 12 March 2016, and continued to work in division two with CD Lugo (two spells), Real Valladolid, CD Tenerife and Deportivo de La Coruña.

Managerial statistics

References

External links

Official website 

1966 births
Living people
Spanish footballers
Footballers from Vilagarcía de Arousa
Association football goalkeepers
Segunda División B players
Tercera División players
Racing de Ferrol footballers
Spanish football managers
La Liga managers
Segunda División managers
Segunda División B managers
Racing de Ferrol managers
Gimnàstic de Tarragona managers
Polideportivo Ejido managers
CD Alcoyano managers
Albacete Balompié managers
CD Lugo managers
Real Valladolid managers
CD Tenerife managers
Deportivo de La Coruña managers